Myth & Mogul: John DeLorean is a 2021 British limited docuseries directed by Mike Connolly. Its story follows the life and turbulent career of automobile engineer and executive John DeLorean, which is told through archival footage and interviews. The series was released on 30 July 2021.

Reception 
The series received a 100% approval rating based on 7 votes on the review aggregator site Rotten Tomatoes.

References

External links 

2021 British television series debuts
2021 British television series endings
2020s British documentary television series
2020s British television series
2020s British television miniseries
English-language Netflix original programming
Netflix original documentary television series